Hajji Deh (also Romanized as Ḩājjī Deh; also known as Ḩājad and Khadzhidy) is a village in Dasht-e Veyl Rural District, Rahmatabad and Blukat District, Rudbar County, Gilan Province, Iran. At the 2006 census, its population was 137, in 45 families.

References 

Populated places in Rudbar County